Qızılağac, Ghizil-Agaj, Kyzylagach, Kyzylagadzh, Kizil’-Agach, Kizyl-Aghach or Kizyl-Agach may refer to the following places in Azerbaijan:
Qızılağac, Goychay
Qızılağac, Masally
Qızılağac, Salyan
Ghizil-Agaj State Reserve

See also
 Qyzylaghash, Almaty Province, Kazakhstan